Ludwig "Lu" Norbert Carbyn is an internationally recognized expert on wolf biology, a research scientist emeritus at the Canadian Wildlife Service, and an adjunct professor at the University of Alberta in Edmonton, Alberta. He has studied wolf ecology and behaviour in Canada since 1970, including pioneering research into the ecological role of wolves as predators in the Canadian Rocky Mountains and great plains as well as the wolf-bison ecosystem of Wood Buffalo National Park. On a Canadian Wildlife Service assignment in Jasper National Park, he became the first human to study wild wolves from within a wolf pack using habituation, a method of gaining insights into the biology of wolves portrayed in fiction by Farley Mowat's popular book and film, Never Cry Wolf.

Carbyn has conducted research on the ecology of various species of canids in Poland, Portugal, and throughout North America, and was the chairman of the successful Canadian Swift Fox Reintroduction program Recovery Team from 1989 to 1993. He has published six books and numerous articles about wolves, including The Buffalo Wolf - Predators, Prey and the Politics of Nature (2003, Smithsonian Books) which was distinguished as "Best of the Year - Wildlife" in 2004 by the Canadian Geographic magazine. In 2013, Carbyn received the Queen Elizabeth II Diamond Jubilee Medal for services to wildlife conservation in Canada.

Education
B.A., Biology, Mount Allison University (1963) 
M.Sc., Zoology, University of Alberta (1967) 
Ph.D., Zoology, University of Toronto (1975)

References

External links
University of Alberta faculty page
Lu Carbyn's personal site

Living people
Canadian biologists
Canadian ecologists
Year of birth missing (living people)